When Danger Smiles is a 1922 American silent Western film directed by William Duncan and starring Duncan, Edith Johnson and James Farley.

Cast
 William Duncan as Ray Chapman
 Edith Johnson as Frania Caravelle
 James Farley as Jacob Holmar
 Henry Hebert as Francisco Caravalle
 Charles Dudley as Jim Barker
 William McCall as Marshall

References

Bibliography
 Langman, Larry. A Guide to Silent Westerns. Greenwood Publishing Group, 1992.

External links
 

1922 films
1922 Western (genre) films
American black-and-white films
Vitagraph Studios films
Films directed by William Duncan
Silent American Western (genre) films
1920s English-language films
1920s American films